German submarine U-38 was a Type IXA U-boat of Nazi Germany's Kriegsmarine that operated during World War II.

Her keel was laid down on 15 April 1937, by DeSchiMAG AG Weser of Bremen as yard number 943. She was launched on 9 August 1938 and commissioned on 24 October with Kapitänleutnant Heinrich Liebe in command.

U-38 conducted eleven patrols, as part of several flotillas. During her career, she sank over 30 enemy vessels and damaged a further one. U-38 ranks as one of the most successful U-boats in World War II. She was scuttled west of Wesermünde (Modern Bremerhaven) on 5 May 1945. Throughout the war, the U-Boat suffered no losses among her crew.

Design
As one of the eight original German Type IX submarines, later designated IXA, U-38 had a displacement of  when at the surface and  while submerged. She had two shafts and two  propellers.

U-38 was fitted with six  torpedo tubes (four fitted at the bow and two at the stern), 22 torpedoes, one  SK C/32 naval gun, 180 rounds, and a  SK C/30 as well as a  C/30 anti-aircraft gun. The boat had a complement of forty-eight.

Service history

First patrol
U-38 left the port of Wilhelmshaven on 19 August 1939. The boat operated off the coast of Lisbon, returning to port on 18 September. During this four-week period, she sank two ships.

On 5 September 1939 U-38 stopped the French ship Pluvoise, examined her papers and released her. Pluvoise broadcast the event, warning others of the U-boat. For this, Liebe was reprimanded.  The already strict rules restricting submarine warfare were further tightened to prevent a recurrence of the event and all U-boats were instructed to avoid contact with any French merchant vessels.

The British steam freighter SS Manaar was sunk on 6 September 1939. U-38 opened fire on the freighter, intending to stop her, but she returned fire. This was the first time that a merchantman fired at a U-boat. Stunned by this unexpected response, U-38 dived and sank Manaar with torpedoes. Citing the fact that Manaar had fired at him, Liebe did not assist the survivors, reasoning that the vessel was exempted from protection by the Submarine Protocol.  Berlin would release to the media the narrative that the Manaar had fired on U-38 on sight.  While Karl Dönitz did not believe that his submarines should have to maintain adherence to the Submarine Protocol in the face of armed merchantmen, due to the political situation, restrictions remained in force after this incident and he was merely able to issue instruction to all submarines to exercise caution. Radio Officer James Turner remained at his post until the last moment. As he was leaving he found two Lascars, one badly injured. Turner rescued both men while under continuous fire from U-38, for this he was awarded the Empire Gallantry Medal.

On 11 September 1939, while flying the Irish tricolour, Inverliffey was shelled and sunk. In spite of Captain William Trowsdale's protestation that they were Irish, Liebe said that they "were sorry" but they would sink Inverliffey as she was carrying contraband petrol to England. The crew took to the lifeboats. Inverliffey burned fiercely, endangering the lifeboats. At risk to herself, the German submarine approached, threw lines to the lifeboats and towed them to safety. As Captain Trowsdale's lifeboat was damaged, the occupants were allowed to board the U-boat. The captain did not have a lifebelt, so he was given one. U-38 stopped the American tanker R.G. Stewart and put Inverliffeys crew on board. Just two days earlier, Inver tankers transferred its ships from the Irish to the British registry.

Second patrol
After nearly two months in port, U-38 left Wilhelmshaven, again with Heinrich Liebe in command, on 12 November 1939. This second patrol was to see the boat operate in the waters northwest of Norway.

The mission required coded messages to be flashed to Soviet naval vessels patrolling the area preceding a Soviet escort to the prospective base location.

U-36 never left the Norwegian Sea and was sunk by the British submarine . U-38 rounded the North Cape uneventfully and arrived in Teriberka Bay by mid-afternoon on 26 November. Running silently into the bay, U-38 had to avoid being spotted by merchant vessels in order to help maintain the Soviet Union's attempted appearance of neutrality at that time. U-38s captain commented that, while in the area of the North Cape and the Kola Peninsula, he had observed thirty to forty targets and regrettably had been "harmless to [all] of them."

After completing the clandestine reconnaissance mission, U-38 returned to raiding duties and sank three ships, two British and one Greek. The British steam freighter SS Thomas Walton was sunk on 7 December. The Greek steam freighter SS Garoufalia was destroyed on 11 December, as was the British steam freighter  on 13 December. After an operational period of four and a half weeks, U-38 returned to Wilhelmshaven on 16 December.

Third patrol

Once again, U-38 would spend considerable time in port, prior to sailing on 26 February 1940, for operations in the Western Approaches.

U-38 sank six ships. First sent to the bottom was the neutral Irish steam trawler  on 9 March, with a single shell at point-blank range off Tory Island, all 11 crew were lost. The Leukos was fishing in the company of British trawlers; it has been speculated that she positioned herself between the surfacing U-boat and the fleeing British in the belief that her neutral markings would protect her. This event was followed by the sinking of the Danish motor freighters SS Argentina on 17 March and SS Algier and SS Christiansborg on 21 March. The Norwegian motor freighter MV Cometa was sunk on 26 March. The sixth and final ship sunk during this third patrol was the Finnish steam freighter SS Signe on 2 April. After nearly six weeks on the high seas, U-38 returned to Wilhelmshaven on 5 April 1940.

Fourth patrol
U-38 left her home port of Wilhelmshaven with Heinrich Liebe in command on 8 April 1940. She would sweep the waters off Norway, supporting the occupation of that country by Nazi troops. During this patrol, U-38 reported problems with her torpedoes, after  was fired upon with no result. U-38 would return to port on 27 April.

There were two naval battles of Narvik on 10 and 13 April 1940. U-38 and U-65 were positioned at the entrance to the fjord. In the second battle, U-38 fired at Effingham, but the torpedoes malfunctioned, (exploding prematurely).

Fifth patrol
For her fifth patrol, U-38 would again depart from Wilhelmshaven with Heinrich Liebe in command on 6 June 1940. She was to patrol the waters off southern Ireland. During this operation, Liebe would hit six ships, two of which were sailing in convoy at the time. On 14 June, U-38 sank the Greek steam freighter SS Mount Myrto. The next day, U-38 sank two ships, both sailing as part of Convoy HX 47, sailing from Halifax to England. First sunk was the Canadian steam freighter SS Erik Boye, followed by the Norwegian motor tanker MV Italia. Five days later, on 20 June, the Swedish steam freighter SS Tilia Gorthon was torpedoed and sunk. The Belgian steam freighter SS Luxembourg was destroyed on 21 June, followed by the Greek steam freighter SS Neion the following day. After three weeks at sea, U-38 returned to Wilhelmshaven on 2 July.

During this patrol, U-38 was able to land Walter Simon, a Nazi agent, at Dingle Bay in Ireland on 12 June. Not realising that the passenger services of the Tralee and Dingle Light Railway had been closed fourteen months earlier, he asked when the next train to Dublin was. He was arrested and interned in the Curragh Camp for the duration of the war.

Sixth patrol
U-38 would depart Wilhelmshaven for the last time on 1 August 1940, again with Heinrich Liebe in command. On this month-long patrol off the western coast of Ireland, U-38 would hit and sink three ships, all of which were in convoy at the time of attack. On 7 August the Egyptian liner  was sunk while traveling with HX 61, from Halifax to Gibraltar, 320 died. The British steam freighter SS Llanfair was hit and sunk, travelling as part of SL-41 from Sierra Leone to England. The third and final ship hit on the sixth patrol of U-38 was the British steam freighter SS Har Zion, while travelling with the Convoy OB 225, from Liverpool to the United States. After four weeks at sea Liebe returned U-38 to her new home port of Lorient in France on 3 September 1940.

Seventh patrol
For her first patrol from Lorient and her seventh overall, U-38 would again be under the command of Heinrich Liebe. She departed on 25 September, for the Northwest Approaches. She would attack five ships on this patrol, sinking four of them. On 1 October, the British motor freighter MV Highland Patriot was torpedoed. After two weeks of no victories, U-38 was successful against the Greek steam freighter SS Aenos on 17 October, sailing as part of Convoy SC 7, from Sydney, Nova Scotia to England. The following day, the British steam freighter SS Carsbreck was damaged, but not sunk, while traveling with the SC 7 convoy from Sydney to Grimsby, England. On 19 October, two ships were hit, both sailing as part of the HX 79 convoy: the Dutch SS Bilderdijk and the British steam freighter SS Matheran. Following these victories, U-38 returned to Lorient on 24 October 1940.

Eighth patrol
U-38 would depart Lorient with Liebe in command once again on 18 December 1940. The eighth war patrol of her career would involve operations again in the Northwest Approaches. During this patrol, the submarine would hit and sink two ships. On 27 December, U-38 destroyed the British ship SS Waiotira, and on 31 December, she sank the Swedish motor freighter SS Valparaiso, sailing as part of the HX 97 convoy from Halifax to Glasgow. U-38 returned to port on 22 January 1941.

Ninth patrol
U-38 would spend two and a half months in port, before leaving for operations off the west coast of Africa on 9 April 1941. This would prove to be her most successful patrol, with the sinking of eight ships. On 4 May, the Swedish steam freighter SS Japan was torpedoed while traveling with Convoy OB 310 from England to the United States. The following day, the British motor freighter MV Queen Maud was hit and sunk. On 23 May, the Dutch motor freighter SS Berhala was sunk while traveling with the Convoy OB 318, from England to America. The British steam freighter SS Vulcain was torpedoed and sunk on 24 May. Six days later, on 29 May, the British steam freighter SS Tabaristan was another victim. The following day the destruction continued, the British steam freighter SS Empire Protector was sent to the bottom, as was the Norwegian steam freighter SS Rinda on the 31st. The eighth and final ship sunk during U-38 ninth patrol was the British cargo steamship  on 8 June. The boat then returned to Lorient on 29 June 1941, after spending eleven and a half weeks at sea.

Tenth patrol
For the first time in her career, U-38 would head to sea with a new commander, Korvettenkapitän Heinrich Schuch. She left on 6 August, for a five-week patrol in the North Atlantic. During this time one ship was hit, the Panamanian steam freighter SS Longtanker on 18 August. U-38 returned to Lorient on 14 September 1941.

11th and 12th Patrols
U-38 would depart from Lorient for the last time on 15 October, again with Heinrich Schuch in command. Her eleventh patrol was to take place in the North Atlantic. However, during a period of five weeks, not a single ship was hit. U-38 traveled to the U-boat base in Bergen, Norway on 21 November. She would later depart Bergen on the 23rd and arrive in Stettin on 29 November.

Life after active duty
From December 1941 until November 1943, U-38 was used as a training boat in the 24th and 21st U-boat Flotillas. She was then used as a testing boat, until she was scuttled by her crew on 5 May 1945.

Wolfpacks
U-38 took part in five wolfpacks, namely.
 Prien (12–17 June 1940)
 Grönland (10–27 August 1941)
 Markgraf (27 August – 3 September 1941)
 Schlagetot (20 October – 1 November 1941)
 Raubritter (1–11 November 1941)

Summary of raiding history

Notes

References

Bibliography

Philbin III, Tobias R., The Lure of Neptune: German-Soviet Naval Collaboration and Ambitions, 1919 – 1941, University of South Carolina Press, 1994,

External links

German Type IX submarines
U-boats commissioned in 1938
World War II submarines of Germany
1938 ships
Ships built in Bremen (state)
Operation Regenbogen (U-boat)
Maritime incidents in May 1945